Ugo Pozzan (29 December 1929 – 4 November 1973) was an Italian association football manager and footballer who played as a midfielder. He represented the Italy national football team twice, the first being on 24 June 1956, the occasion of a friendly match against Argentina in a 1–0 away loss.

Honours

Player
Lazio
Coppa Italia: 1958

References

1929 births
1973 deaths
Italian footballers
Italy international footballers
Association football midfielders
Serie A players
Serie B players
Hellas Verona F.C. players
Bologna F.C. 1909 players
S.S. Lazio players
Pisa S.C. players
Hellas Verona F.C. managers
U.S. Pistoiese 1921 managers
Pisa S.C. managers
Italian football managers